This article lists embassies and consulates posted in Malta. There are currently 24 embassies/high commissions in Malta. Several other countries have non resident embassies.

Embassies/High Commissions in Malta

Non-resident representation 
Resident in Rome unless otherwise noted

 (Andorra la Vella)

 (Vienna)

 (Tunis)
 (Athens)

 (London)

 (Tripoli)
 (Paris)
 (Paris)
 
 
   

 (Madrid)
 (London)

 (London)

 (Geneva)
 (Madrid)
 (Tripoli)

 (Paris)
 (Paris)

 (London)

 (Tunis)

 (Tunis)

 (Geneva)

 (Geneva)

 (London)

 (Geneva)
 (London)
 (New York City)

 (Tripoli)

 (New York City)

 (London)
 (London)
 (Madrid)
 (Tripoli)
 

 
 (New York City)

 (Tunis)

 (San Marino)

 (Cairo)

 
 (Tripoli)
 (Stockholm)

 (Geneva)

 (Athens)
 (Paris)
 
 
 (Paris)

 (Paris)

 (Tripoli)

Former embassies/High Commissions

See also 
 Foreign relations of Malta
 Visa requirements for Maltese citizens

Notes

References

External links 
  List of embassies and high commissions

Foreign relations of Malta
Malta
Diplomatic missions